Abdul Haris Nasution, National Hero of Indonesia
 Adam Malik, Politician
 Adnan Buyung Nasution, Lawyer
 Amir Sjarifuddin, Politician
 Armijn Pane, Writer
 Basyral Hamidy Harahap, Writer
 Burhanuddin Harahap, Politician
 Cosmas Batubara, Politician
 Darmin Nasution, Businessman
 Diana Nasution, Singer, actress
 Faisal Basri, Economist
 Hamsad Rangkuti, Writer
 Harun Idris, Malaysian politician
 Hasjrul Harahap, Politician
 Lafran Pane, Educator
 Merari Siregar, Writer
 Mochtar Lubis, Journalist
 Prisia Nasution, Actress
 Sakinah Junid, Malaysia Women activism
 Saifuddin Nasution Ismail, Malaysian politician
 Sanusi Pane, Writer
 Sholeh Mahmoed Nasution, Indonesian Islamic televangelist
 Suhaimi Kamaruddin, Malaysian lawyer
 Soeman Hs, Indonesian writer
 Todung Mulya Lubis, Lawyer
 Willem Iskander, Indonesian writer, educator

Mandailing

Mandailing